is a Japanese politician of the Democratic Party of Japan, a member of the House of Representatives in the Diet (national legislature). A native of Kōsei Town (today's Konan City, Shiga Prefecture) and dropout of Ritsumeikan University, he was elected to the town assembly of Kōsei, Shiga (serving for one term), to the assembly of Shiga Prefecture in 1979 (serving for four terms) and to the House of Representatives for the first time in 1995.

References

External links

 Official website in Japanese.

1944 births
Living people
People from Shiga Prefecture
Ritsumeikan University alumni
Members of the House of Representatives (Japan)
Democratic Party of Japan politicians
21st-century Japanese politicians